The 2010 Penrith Panthers season was the 44th in the club's history. Coached by Matthew Elliott and captained by Petero Civoniceva, they competed in the National Rugby League's 2010 Telstra Premiership season.

Milestones and achievements
 13 March – Round One: Four players made their debuts for the Panthers; Adrian Purtell, Kevin Kingston, Nigel Plum and Travis Burns.
 20 March – Round Two: Petero Civoniceva played his 250th NRL game.
 27 March – Round Three: Sam McKendry scored his 1st NRL try.
 16 May – Round Ten: Michael Jennings scored his 50th NRL try.
 24 May – Round Eleven: Michael Gordon kicked his 200th NRL goal.
 9 August – Round Twenty-two: Brad Tighe played his 100th NRL game.
 20 August –  Round Twenty-four: Kevin Kingston played his 100th NRL game.
 20 August –  Round Twenty-four: Petero Civoniceva played his 50th game for the Panthers.
 20 August –  Round Twenty-four: Michael Gordon set a new club record for points in a single game (3 tries, 9 goals, 30 points).
 4 September –  Round Twenty-six: Michael Gordon set a new club record for points in a season (14 tries, 98 goals, 252 points).
 7 September: Luke Lewis named Dally M Lock of the Year.
 18 September – Semi-final Two: Nathan Smith played his 100th NRL game.

Jersey and Sponsors

In 2010 the Panthers jerseys were again made by ISC. They retained their predominantly black home jerseys from 2009, while revealing a new teal and white away strip. The new away strip was designed featuring performance technology and weighed less than half of the previous away design.

Sanyo were again the major sponsor of the Panthers in 2010. Titan Warehousing Solutions replaced ABCOE Distributors as the sleeve sponsor. HOSTPLUS secured the shorts sponsorship while Tony Ferguson retained the rights for the back of the jersey.

The Panthers once again participated in the heritage round, sporting a retro strip. This jersey featured a white V on a predominately brown background, paired with white shorts.

Fixtures 
The Panthers again used CUA Stadium as their home ground in 2010, their home ground since they entered the competition in 1967.

Pre-season
The main squad returned to training on 5 November 2009 to start preparing for the 2010 season. Players involved in the 2009 Four Nations and 2009 Pacific Cup returned to training later.

Regular season

Finals Series

Ladder

2010 Player Statistics and Coaching Staff

 Panthers Group CEO: Glenn Matthews
 Rugby League CEO: Mick Leary
 Head Coach: Matthew Elliott
 Rugby League Marketing Manager: Shannon Donato
 Media Manager: Andrew Farrell
 Coaching, Development and Recruitment Manager: Jim Jones
 Stadium Operations Manager: Tamara Van Antwerpen

Transfers

Gains

Losses

Rep Players

Other Teams
In 2010 the Panthers again compete in the Toyota Cup while senior players who were not required for the first team play with the Windsor Wolves in the NSW Cup.

2010 U20 Panthers

Trivia
 Michael Gordon kicked 82% of his shots at goal in 2010. Gordon's 252 points in the regular season was the highest by any player since Hazem El Masri's 296-point haul in 2006.
 Penrith equalled the NRL's sixth biggest comeback, defeating the Knights in round 4 after trailing by 18 points at half time.
 In round 25, against the Bulldogs, Petero Civoniceva became the first player sent off for 2010.

Note: As of round 26, trials not included.

References

External links
 Panthers official site

Penrith Panthers seasons
Penrith Panthers season